MK Ultra is a 2022 American psychological thriller film written and directed by ex-intelligence officer Joseph Sorrentino. Based on a true story about the human experimentation program MKUltra conducted by Central Intelligence Agency (CIA) in the 1960s, the film follows Dr. Ford Strauss (Anson Mount), a psychiatrist who gets involved in a government experiment and conspiracy involving the use of psychedelic and other mind-controlling substances.  It was released theatrically and on video on demand on October 7, 2022.

Premise 
In the early 1960s, during the CIA's secret and illegal human experimentation program MK-Ultra, Dr. Ford Strauss (Anson Mount), a psychiatrist, is attempting to get medical LSD testings approved; his moral and scientific boundaries are pushed to the limit, as he is approached by CIA agent Galvin Morgan (Jason Patric) to run a subsect of the program in a rural Mississippi psychiatric hospital. As he conducts the experiments on a drug addict, an arsonist, a transgender woman, and an animal killer, Dr. Strauss begins to question Agent Morgan’s ethics and disentangles an incomprehensible conspiracy.

Cast

Production 
Formerly titled Midnight Climax, MK Ultra is the third feature film directed by Joseph Sorrentino, who previously comes from an Intelligence Operations background. He wrote the film based on a true story about the illegal human experimentation program Project MK-Ultra, conducted by Central Intelligence Agency in the 1960s. The film is produced by LB Entertainment and Ten Past Nine Productions with Suzy Bergner, Tom Rooker and Sigurjon Sighvatsson as executive producers.

Release 
The official trailer has been released on August 31, 2022. The film was released theatrically, and on video on demand on October 7, 2022 in the United States through Cinedigm, and worldwide through Bleiberg Entertainment.

See also 

 Project MK-Ultra
 Operation Midnight Climax
 Unethical human experimentation
 in the United States

Notes

References

External links 
 
 MK Ultra on Mubi
 MK Ultra on Rotten Tomatoes

2020s English-language films
2022 psychological thriller films
2022 thriller films
American psychological thriller films
American thriller films
Films about drugs
Films about hallucinogens
Films about mind control
Films about the Central Intelligence Agency
Human experimentation in fiction
Works about Project MKUltra